Camerini refers to the people of Cameria or Camerium, an ancient city of Latium.

Camerini is also a family name of Italian origin. It may refer to:

 Alberto Camerini, Italian singer-songwriter and musician
 Mario Camerini, Italian film director and screenwriter
 Francis Camerini, French footballer

See also 
 Camerini d'alabastro

Italian-language surnames